In the Dust of the Stars (German: Im Staub der Sterne, Romanian: Revoltă în cosmos) is a 1976 East German science fiction film, co-produced with Romania and directed by Gottfried Kolditz. Some of the film's props were part of a 2009 exhibit entitled "Retrospektive in die Zukunft" and Twitch Film screened the film as part of their Attack The Bloc screening series.

Synopsis 

The spaceship Cynro has received a distress call from the planet TEM 4. The crew tries to respond but ends up crash landing on the planet as a result of radio waves. Emerging from the ship, the crew is brought to the planet's leader Ronk (Milan Beli), who tells the Cynro crew that there was never any accident and that the distress call was all a mistake. As an apology he invites the crew to a party, much to the misgivings of Suko (Alfred Struwe), the ship's navigator. Sensing that there is more to Ronk's claims, Suko refuses the invitation.

His concerns end up being well-founded after Ronk uses the party to remove any memories of the fake distress call and Suko discovers a subterranean mine where Ronk forces captives to work as slaves. The Cynro crew is unable to decide whether they should return to their ship and escape or stay and help the slaves gain freedom. This choice is ultimately made for them when the slaves revolt and the ensuing battle forces the crew to leave the planet, leaving behind their commander and Suko, who is dying. The film ends with the natives burying Suko.

Cast 

 Jana Brejchová: Akala
 Alfred Struwe: Suko
 Ekkehard Schall: Chief
 Milan Beli: Ronk
 Silvia Popovici: Illik
 Violeta Andrei: Rall
 Leon Niemczyk: Thob
 Regine Heintze: Miu
 Mihai Mereuță: Kte
 Ștefan Mihăilescu-Brăila: Xik

Editions 

The original, uncut version of the film was rereleased by the DEFA Film Library at the University of Massachusetts Amherst in 2005.

Reception 

DVD Verdict gave the film a positive review, calling it a "guilty pleasure" and a "fun, cheesy movie". DVD Talk also praised the film and wrote "Though it's easy to mock its very '70s art direction, costume design and general sensibility, In the Dust of the Stars (Im Staub der Sterne, 1975) exhibits much imagination throughout."

References

Bibliography
Berghahn, Daniela (2005), Hollywood Behind the Wall: The Cinema of East Germany, Manchester University Press, p. 41, 
Brockmann, Stephen (2010), A Critical History of German Film (Studies in German Literature Linguistics and Culture), Camden Press, p. 230, 
Hake, Sabine (2007), German National Cinema (National Cinemas), Routledge, p. 137, 
Scalzi, John (2005), The Rough Guide to Sci-Fi Movies, Rough Guides, p. 257,

External links 

1976 films
1970s science fiction films
German science fiction films
East German films
1970s German-language films
Films directed by Gottfried Kolditz
1970s German films